Mueang Lamphun is the capital district (amphoe mueang) of Lamphun province, northern Thailand.

Geography
Neighboring districts are (from the south clockwise) Mae Tha and Pa Sang  of Lamphun Province, San Pa Tong, Hang Dong, Saraphi of Chiang Mai province, Ban Thi of Lamphun and Mae On of Chiang Mai. 

The main river of the district is the Ping River.

Administration
The district is divided into 17 sub-districts (tambons), which are further subdivided into 158 villages (mubans). The town (thesaban mueang) Lamphun covers tambon Nai Mueang. There are three more sub-district municipalities (thesaban tambons): Umong and Rim Ping cover the complete same-named tambons, and Ban Paen parts of tambons Ban Paen and Nong Nam. There are a further 12 tambon administrative organizations (TAO).

External links
amphoe.com (Thai)

Mueang Lamphun